Nyawita is a settlement in Kenya's Nyanza Province. It is located within Kisumu District, Winam Division. Nyawita is a sub-location that was once famous for being an economic hub for traders  in the region; an activity that has since declined owing to many factors such as lack of a well established public transportation system to and from the settlement, among others. It now remains mainly a residential area with scattered shopping kiosks which its residents depend on daily. 

Populated places in Nyanza Province